Manilkara cavalcantei is a species of plant in the family Sapotaceae. It is endemic to Brazil, where it is threatened by habitat loss.

References

cavalcantei
Plants described in 1990
Vulnerable plants
Flora of Brazil
Taxonomy articles created by Polbot